Sodian Gujar railway station is located in Punjab, Pakistan.

See also
 List of railway stations in Pakistan
 Pakistan Railways

References

External links

Railway stations in Jhelum District
Railway stations on Dandot Light Railway Line